Wappo is an extinct language that was spoken by the Wappo tribe, Native Americans who lived in what is now known as the Alexander Valley north of San Francisco. The last fluent speaker, Laura Fish Somersal, died in 1990. The loss of this language is attributed to the general use of English in schools and workplaces.

Wappo is generally believed to be distantly related to the Yuki language. It is distinguished by influence of Pomoan languages.

According to Somersal, the English name for the people and language is derived from the Spanish word guapo, meaning "handsome" or "brave". The people called themselves Micewal. The Pomoan exonym, or name for them, was Ashochimi ("northerners").

Paul Radin published the first texts on Wappo grammar in the 1920s. Jesse O. Sawyer published English-Wappo Vocabulary in 1965 and continued to study Wappo grammar throughout his life. Other linguists who have contributed to the study of Wappo include William E. Elmendorf, Alice Shepherd, Sandra Thompson, Joseph Sung-Yul Park, and Charles N. Li.

Phonology

Vowels
Wappo has five vowel qualities, but the literature is inconsistent as to whether a length distinction exists. In his Wappo lexicon, Sawyer transcribes long vowels, but Thompson et al., who worked with the same speaker, report that they did not hear any long vowels.

According to Radin, the following diphthongs occur in Wappo: /ao/, /ai/, /ɛo/, /ɛi/, /ɛu/, /ei/, /ɔi/, /iɛ/, and /ui/.

Consonants
The transcription style (bolded symbols below) is based on Sawyer's work with Somersal, with further interpretation by Thompson, Park and Li.  Thompson et al. propose that Wappo has three types of stops: plain, aspirated and glottalized. Stops plus /h/ are therefore treated as single aspirated stops. Sawyer notes that /f/, /d/, /g/, /r/ and /rʼ/ are used for Spanish borrowings.

The above table omits  /cʰ/ [] and  /čʰ/ [].

Stress and tone
Wappo word stress is predictable, in that the first syllable of the word stem is stressed.  In the examples below, the accent marks stress.
 méhwa "wild grape vine"
 kálkuʔ "greyhound"
Wappo does not make distinctions in tone.

Phonological processes
 Glottal stops are inserted word-initially in words that would otherwise begin with a vowel.
 If a word stem ends in a vowel and a suffix immediately following the stem begins with a vowel, one of those vowels is elided.  In most cases, the vowel at the beginning of the suffix is deleted. For example, čoči-iʔ, which is the root "weave" plus the durative suffix, has the surface representation of čoči?.

Morphology

Nouns
Nouns can be divided into human and non-human classes, which is relevant for pluralization.  Human nouns are consistently inflected for plurality, but non-human nouns do not have to be inflected for plurality, even when their reference is in fact plural.  For example, onoʔšiʔ-te "Indians" has the plural suffix -te, but mansanaʔi  "apples" lacks the suffix.

Verbs
Wappo also has rich inflectional and derivational morphology in its verb phrases.  There are five categories of tense or aspect: habitual/progressive, stative, past, inchoative and future.  Each verb root takes at least two forms to which suffixes are added. The form used depends on the tense.  The forms themselves are determined by the verb's semantic class, which is basically determined by the habitual/progressive suffix used. Specific suffixes result in changes to the verb stem, for example, -lik- is added to the root of verbs occurring with the rare imperative suffix -laʔ. This occurs in the imperative for "sleep", in which the stem is changed from hinto- to hintolik-.  Epenthesis also occurs in certain situations, depending on the form of the root and the suffix added.

Thompson et al. provide the following examples of tense/aspect categories.  The relevant forms are bolded, and all of the forms follow Sawyer's transcription style.

Negatives are marked by the suffix lahkhiʔ.

Prefixes are also added to verb phrases.  There are speaker-oriented directional prefixes which are grouped into two classes, depending on whether the motion of the verb is directed at or away from the speaker. In narrative contexts, the direction may refer to a character. For example, two directional prefixes are ma- "away from speaker" and te- "toward speaker".  Non-speaker-oriented directional prefixes include ho-, meaning "around" and pi-, meaning "accidentally".  Wappo also includes pre-verbal desiderative and optative mood particles.  The desiderative particle, k'ah, is used to indicate that the speaker wishes something were true. The optative particle, keye, is translated as "could", "can", or "should".

Syntax

Word order
Wappo has a predicate-final word order.

Patient-initial structures are acceptable, albeit less common.

Wappo allows for more freedom in word order in complement clauses, especially when they have first person subjects.  All three sentences below are acceptable translations of "I know that the man caught a fish".

In noun phrases, demonstrative and genitive modifiers precede the noun, while numerals and adjectives follow the noun.

In verb phrases, oblique arguments and adverbs come before the verb.

Case system
Wappo has a rich case system which uses suffixes to mark cases.  In the examples below, the words relevant to the case being discussed are in boldface.

The accusative case is unmarked. Patients, arguments of transitive verbs that are patient-like, all subjects in dependent clauses and single arguments in copulas take the accusative case.
 

The nominative case is marked with the suffix -i.  Words functioning as initiators, agents, experiencers of transitive verbs and the single argument of an intransitive verb take the nominative case.  If the noun stem to which this suffix is added happens to ends with a vowel, the stem-final vowel is dropped or changed.  Otherwise, adding the nominative suffix does not change the stem.  The examples below illustrate the contrast.  
 pol'eʔ "boy" → pol'eʔi "boys"
 k'ešu "deer (singular)" → k'eši "deer (plural)"

The dative case, which is used to indicate the recipient or direction, is marked with -thu.  

The benefactive case is marked with -ma.  It is used to mark whom the action benefits.  

The instrumental case, used with intensive reflexives and instruments, is marked with -thiʔ.  

The comitative case is marked with -k'a and is used to indicate accompaniment.

The genitive case is marked with -meʔ. It can only be used in constructions with alienable possession. (Inalienable possession is expressed through the juxtaposition of the two relevant nouns.)

Wappo also has a locative case, which is marked with suffixes such as -pi "away from" and -cawoh "on top of".

Questions

Yes-no questions
To mark yes-no questions, a question particle, /hVʔ/, is added after the verb. It does not have to directly follow the verb.  The particle's vowel harmonizes with the vowel that precedes it. In all of the examples blow, the question word is glossed as "Q" and is also in boldface. 

The particle is usually at the end of the sentence, but as the example below demonstrates, it is not always sentence-final. Its location depends on the composition of the verb phrase.

Question-word questions
Question words are usually located clause-initially. 

Question words can also get case inflection, except in cases of inalienable possession, where no suffix is added. 

Question words can also be used as indefinite pronouns.

Language contact and influence
Language contact with Spanish has influenced Wappo's sound structure and vocabulary.  As listed above in the consonant section, /f/, /d/, /g/, /r/ and /rʼ/ are used for Spanish borrowings.  Many of the first words borrowed from Spanish into Wappo referred to items that were traded.  In some cases, words may have been borrowed from other American Indian languages in contact with Spanish, rather than directly from Spanish. Below are two examples of borrowings from Spanish.

 čičaloʔ "pea" was borrowed from chícharo 
 háros "rice" was borrowed from arroz

While contact with English has not greatly influenced Wappo's lexicon, it has influenced its syntax.  Thompson et al. cite the sentences below as examples of an expanded use of the benefactive case that could have arisen from contact with English.  

While Wappo has a predicate-final structure, question words are clause-initial in most cases.  This is unexpected, and possibly resulting from English influence.  

In another potential example of English influence, the word neʔ-khiʔ "have" is used in deontic expressions, and its meaning is adapted as "have to".

Regional variation
Wappo had 5 varieties:

 Clear Lake Wappo
 Russian River Wappo ( Western Wappo)
 Northern Wappo
 Central Wappo
 Southern Wappo

See also
 Wappo
 Yuki–Wappo languages

References

BENEF:benefactive case
DIR:directional prefixes

Bibliography
 
 
 
 
 Radin, Paul. 1929. A grammar of the Wappo language. University of California Publications in American Archaeology and Ethnology 27:1-194.
 Sawyer, Jesse O., English-Wappo Vocabulary (Aug 25, 1965). UC Publications in Linguistics. Paper vol. 43.
 Sawyer, Jesse O., "Wappo studies" (1984). Survey Reports. Report #7.
 Sturtevant, William C. (Ed.). (1978–present). Handbook of North American Indians (Vol. 1-20). Washington, D. C.: Smithsonian Institution. (Vols. 1–3, 16, 18-20 not yet published).

External links
Wappo Language Project at the Western Institute for Endangered Language Documentation
 Wappo language overview at the Survey of California and Other Indian Languages
 Wappo Texts
 OLAC resources in and about the Wappo language
 Wappo, California Language Archive 
 Wappo Indians of Napa County: Language 
 A Reference Grammar of Wappo

Yuki–Wappo languages
Indigenous languages of California
Extinct languages of North America
language
History of Sonoma County, California
Languages extinct in the 1990s